The 2019 World Junior-B Curling Championships was held from December 11 to 18 at the Kisakallio Sports Institute in Lohja, Finland. The event was held to qualify teams for the 2020 World Junior Curling Championships.

Men

Round robin standings
Final Round Robin Standings

Playoffs

Quarterfinals
Tuesday, December 17, 13:30

Semifinals
Wednesday, December 18, 09:00

Bronze medal game
Wednesday, December 18, 14:00

Gold medal game
Wednesday, December 18, 14:00

Women

Round robin standings
Final Round Robin Standings

Playoffs

Quarterfinals
Tuesday, December 17, 18:00

Semifinals
Wednesday, December 18, 09:00

Bronze medal game
Wednesday, December 18, 14:00

Gold medal game
Wednesday, December 18, 14:00

References

External links
Official Website

World Junior-B Curling Championships
Lohja
World Junior-B Curling Championships
World Junior Curling B
World Junior-B Curling Championships
International curling competitions hosted by Finland
World Junior-B Curling